Michael Evan Webber (born 1971) is the Josey Centennial Professor in Energy Resources in the Walker Department of Mechanical Engineering at The University of Texas at Austin and CTO of Energy Impact Partners, a $3 billion cleantech venture fund. Webber’s expertise spans research and education at the convergence of engineering, policy, and commercialization on topics related to innovation, energy, and the environment.

An author, Webber is behind the words of Power Trip: the Story of Energy, published in 2019, and Thirst for Power: Energy, Water and Human Survival. He was selected as a Fellow of the American Society of Mechanical Engineers (ASME) and as a member of the 4th class of the Presidential Leadership Scholars, which is a leadership training program organized by Presidents George W. Bush and William J. Clinton.  He serves on the advisory board for Scientific American and GTI Energy (an industry consortium formerly known as the Gas Technology Institute).

Webber was one of three entrepreneurs to found educational technology startup, DISCO Learning Media, in 2015, which was ultimately acquired in 2018. Webber holds a B.S. and B.A. from UT Austin, and M.S. and Ph.D. in mechanical engineering from Stanford University.

Biography 
Webber was born in Austin, Texas, in 1971 to Stephen and Josephine Webber.  His father was professor of Chemistry at the University of Texas at Austin and his mother a self-described bureaucrat.  After graduating from Westlake High School in 1989, he attended the University of Texas at Austin where he played in the Longhorn Band, eventually serving as Drum Major. In 1995, he received a B.S. in Aerospace Engineering and a B.A. in Plan II Honors.  He went to Stanford University in Palo Alto, California, to pursue a M.S. in mechanical engineering.  He continued at Stanford where he was a National Science Foundation Fellow from 1995 to 1998. He completed his Ph.D. at Stanford in 2001 in mechanical engineering with a Ph.D. minor in electrical engineering with advisor Ron K. Hanson. He currently lives in Austin, TX, with his wife and children.

Career

Corporate 
After completing his Ph.D., Webber shifted into private research first at Pranalytica and then at the RAND Corporation where he conducted research on energy, environment and industrial topics. He currently holds six patents as a result of his innovations, mostly related to environmental monitoring and trace gas sensing. With the Austin Technology Incubator, Webber helped originate the Pecan Street Project in 2008. Now, Pecan Street Inc., a public private partnership, supports the innovation and development of smart grid solutions. He  serves on the editorial board of advisors for Scientific American.

Webber was co-Director of the Clean Energy Incubator (2009—2018) and Deputy Director of the Energy Institute (2013—2018) at UT Austin. He has served on the Board of Advisers for Scientific American since 2009. Webber was a member of AT&T’s Sustainability Advisory Council (2009—2012) and a commissioner for Austin Energy (2008—2013) He was a member of the Roundtable on Sustainability with the National Academies of Sciences and Engineering (2012—2018) and was a board member for Sustainable America (2012—2018), the Hope Street Group (2004—2006), and the Houston Advanced Research Center (2012—2018).

From September 2018 to August 2021, Webber was based in Paris, France where he served as the Chief Science and Technology Officer at ENGIE, a global energy & infrastructure services company with 170,000 employees worldwide.

Academic 
Webber joined the University of Texas at Austin in 2006 as associate director of the Center for International Energy and Environmental Policy under the Jackson School of Geosciences. The following year he started as an assistant professor in the Department of Mechanical Engineering. In 2009 he joined the Clean Energy Incubator as Co-Director. The University of Texas System board of Regents recognized Webber in 2011 with the Regents’ Outstanding Teaching Award(11), and he earned tenure the following year. He is now  associate professor in the Department of Mechanical Engineering and Josey Centennial Fellow in Energy Resources. His research group focuses on questions related to energy resources, technology, and policy. In 2013, he was named Deputy Director of the Energy Institute at the University of Texas at Austin.

He was honored as an American Fellow of the German Marshall Fund and an AT&T Industrial Ecology Fellow on four separate occasions by The University of Texas for exceptional teaching.

Author 
His first book, Thirst for Power: Energy, Water and Human Survival, was accompanied by a one hour documentary. His book Power Trip: the Story of Energy was published in 2019 by Basic Books with an award-winning 6-part companion series that aired on PBS, Amazon Prime and Apple TV starting Earth Day 2020. The series had more than 7000 broadcasts in the United States and has been distributed in dozens of countries, ultimately reaching millions of viewers. The second season of Power Trip is currently in production.

Webber has authored four full-length general interest books, created two interactive textbooks, written more than 500 publications, and has been awarded 6 patents.

Other contributions 
Webber starred in "Energy at the Movies," a PBS special which began national syndication in March 2013. Producing parties sought to release up to six episodes a year for five years. The special can now be seen on more than 78 stations in 25 states.

Selected publications and speeches 
Over his career, Webber has published more than 400 articles, columns, reports, commentaries, and books and delivered more than 200 lectures, speeches, and seminars.

Books 
 M. E. Webber. Changing the Way America Thinks About Energy, Petroleum Teaching Extension (PETEX), The University of Texas at Austin (2009)
 M. E. Webber. Thirst for Power: Energy, Water, and Human Survival (2016)
 M.E. Webber, Power Trip: The Story of Energy, Basic Books, February 5, 2019.

Select Peer-Reviewed Journal Articles 
M.E. Webber, D.S. Baer, and R.K. Hanson, “Ammonia Monitoring Near 1.5 μm with Diode Laser Absorption Sensors,” Applied Optics, 40(12), pp. 2031– 2042, 2001

C.W. King and M.E. Webber, “Water Intensity of Transportation,” Environmental Science and Technology, 42(21), pp 7866–7872 (7pp) (September 24, 2008)

A.D. Cuellar and M.E. Webber, “Cow Power: The Energy and Emissions Benefits of Converting Manure to Biogas,” Environmental Research Letters, 3 034002 (8pp) July 2008.

J.S. Vitter and M.E. Webber, “Water Event Disaggregation Using Sub-metered Water and Coincident Electricity Data,” Water 10, 714. https://doi:10.3390/w10060714

Y.R. Glazer, F.T. Davidson, J.J. Lee, and M.E. Webber, “An Inventory and Engineering Assessment of Flared Gas and Liquid Waste Streams From Hydraulic Fracturing in the USA,” Current Sustainable/Renewable Energy Reports, October 2017.

References

External links 
 Webber Energy Group – Official Site
 Energy at the Movies
 Energy 101 – edX
 Webber Energy Youtube 

1971 births
Living people
21st-century American engineers
University of Texas at Austin faculty
University of Texas at Austin College of Liberal Arts alumni
Stanford University alumni
People from Austin, Texas
21st-century American inventors